Akkarfjord is a small fishing village in north-east part of Sørøya in Hammerfest municipality, Troms og Finnmark county, Norway. As of 2016, about 70 people live in Akkarfjord and they have a post office, grocery shop, school and kindergarten.

References

Hammerfest
Villages in Finnmark